Jules Worms (16 December 1832 – 25 November 1924) was a French academic painter and illustrator. Born into a family of Parisian shopkeepers, he entered the École des Beaux-Arts in 1849 at the age of seventeen, where he studied under  (1810–79). He made his debut at the Paris Salon of 1859. Worms is best known for genre scenes depicting Spanish life, often comical and painted in a highly realistic manner with many details and bright colors.

Career

In the early 1860s, Worms made his first trip to Spain, where he was immediately enchanted with Spanish culture and customs. Worms returned for six extended trips between 1860–61 and 1882, traveling widely and gathering sketches and costumes for studio paintings back in Paris. In 1871 he spent six months in Granada with the Catalan painter Marià Fortuny, whom he had met in Paris.

His painting La romance à la mode, exhibited at the Salon of 1868, was purchased by the French State. It is now in the collection of the Musée d'Orsay and is displayed at the Luxembourg Palace in Paris.

Worms continued to exhibit his paintings at the annual Paris Salon until the 1890s. His illustrated memoirs of travels in Spain, Souvenirs d’Espagne, impressions de voyages et croquis, was published in 1906. He continued to paint at least up until World War I, and his paintings continued to sell consistently in both France and the United States. Jules Worms died in Paris at the age of 91 on 25 November 1924.

Worms was made a Knight of the Legion of Honour in 1876. He became a member of the Society of French Artists in 1883.

Works in museums
A work by Worms in the Nob Hill mansion of Leland Stanford was destroyed in the San Francisco earthquake and fire of 1906.

Gallery

Publications
Souvenirs d'Espagne - impressions de voyages et croquis (Memories of Spain - impressions from trips and sketches), illustrated book with 53 engravings and 8 plates after the drawings and paintings by the author, Paris: H. Floury, 1906.

References

External links

 Jules Worms—a brief biography of Worms (in French) and numerous images of his work

1832 births
1924 deaths
19th-century French painters
École des Beaux-Arts alumni
Members of the Académie des beaux-arts
20th-century French painters